Max Gebhardt (27 February 1904 – 17 August 1993) was a German long-distance runner. He competed in the men's 10,000 metres at the 1936 Summer Olympics.

References

1904 births
1993 deaths
Athletes (track and field) at the 1936 Summer Olympics
German male long-distance runners
Olympic athletes of Germany
Place of birth missing
20th-century German people